Pretendiendo (Spanish: Pretending), known as Ugly Me in the U.S., is a 2006 Chilean romantic comedy film directed and written by Claudio Dabed. The film is about a beautiful but romantically disappointed woman named Amanda. In an attempt to avoid men and getting hurt again, she adopts another persona, that of an "ugly" girl, while at the same time posing as a gorgeous vixen named Helena. When Argentinian co-worker and ladies' man Marcelo enters into her life, Helena/Amanda will have to re-think her life choices as a single woman. The film stars Bárbara Mori as Amanda/Helena.

Plot
Amanda, a young woman who is both beautiful and psychopathic, works as an architect. One day, she catches her boyfriend Pablo in bed with another woman, which infuriates her. In a fit of rage, she threatens him with a shotgun and then shoots him in the groin, hoping to prevent him from "cheating" again. As part of a court settlement, a psychiatrist is assigned to evaluate her, and he concludes that Amanda feels no remorse for her actions and would do the same thing again if given the opportunity. Amanda is subsequently fired from her job and decides to leave Santiago. She convinces her brother to let her move into his vacant apartment in Valparaíso.

Realizing that avoiding romance is crucial to maintaining her new life, Amanda resorts to disguising herself as a frumpy, middle-aged woman with children by using a fat suit, unflattering clothes, buck-tooth dentures, makeup, and a wig. She then meets with Max, a local architect, and accepts a lower-paying job at his office. Max introduces her to the rest of the staff, including Guillermo, a married man who is devoted to his family, Karen, a scheming blonde bombshell, and Marcelo, a womanizer. When Amanda meets Marcelo, they both find each other repulsive. Marcelo is disgusted by Amanda's appearance, and Amanda is unsettled by how much he resembles Pablo.

Max selects Amanda to lead an investigation into a maintenance issue at one of their projects, much to Karen's chagrin. During the investigation, Marcelo and Guillermo accompany Amanda, but they mostly engage in conversation about women and sex, leaving Amanda to do most of the work. While checking on a problem, Amanda is forced to remove part of her disguise, which nearly exposes her identity to Marcelo. However, she manages to avoid detection by shining her flashlight into his eyes. After work, Amanda and Marcelo go out for drinks. Amanda lies to Marcelo, claiming that she has two children, and lectures him about the importance of genuine love rather than just pursuing sex. In response, Marcelo tells her that marriage kills love and goes on to describe in detail what kind of woman he desires.

Realizing the potential of this situation, Amanda begins manipulating Marcelo as her true self, using the alias "Helena". As "Helena", she gradually befriends Marcelo, who is puzzled by her disrespectful treatment of him and seeks advice from his co-worker on how to improve their relationship. Karen, envious of their close bond, attempts to embarrass Amanda by asking her to bring her children to the office. Amanda arranges for two orphan boys to be brought in by a compassionate priest and observes that Marcelo enjoys playing with them. Later, she teaches him how to cook a proper meal for "Helena". While conversing with him, they share a kiss.

Marcelo invites "Helena" to his apartment and confesses his love for her. Amanda, feeling that Marcelo's affections are based solely on her unattractive disguise, convinces him to dress up as a woman and handcuff himself to the bed. She then pretends to cut his chest with a fake knife before leaving. The police subsequently rescue him, but the media coverage turns Marcelo into a laughingstock. Amanda later talks to Marcelo at work and discovers that his experience with "Helena" has caused him to swear off relationships until he gets married. Marcelo and Karen begin dating and soon become engaged. Amanda is devastated by Marcelo's decision but agrees to be Karen's maid of honor at the wedding. During the ceremony, Marcelo suddenly falls silent while delivering his vows. Amanda sneezes, and her dentures fall out, revealing her true smile, which is identical to "Helena's." Marcelo realizes that the two women are the same and breaks off his engagement to Karen. The film concludes with Amanda and Marcelo happily married with three children.

Cast 
 Bárbara Mori ...  Amanda Miranda / Helena
 Marcelo Mazzarello ...  Marcelo Rocco
 Amaya Forch ...  Karen
 Gonzalo Robles ...  Brother Juan
 Rodrigo Muñoz ...  Guillermo
 Jaime Azócar ...  Max López
 Alejandro Cohen ...  Dr. Perner
 Paz Bascuñán ...  Fernanda
 Felipe Camiroaga ...  Pepe
 Fernando Kliche ...  Pablo
 Fernando Farías ...  Priest
 Ignacio Mansilla ...  Detective
 Claudia Vergara ...  Max's Wife
 Cristian Martínez ... Nightclub  Macho Guy
 Claudio Dabed ... Nightclub  DJ

External links 
 
 YouTube

2006 films
Chilean comedy films
2006 romantic comedy films
2000s Spanish-language films